Allalmeia was a small notoungulate mammal of around 3 kilograms. It lived in Mendoza Province, Argentina (Divisadero Largo Formation) during the Late Eocene. Allalmeia belonged to the Oldfieldthomasiidae family within the suborder Typotheria.

Description 
It was a small digitigrade mammal, with brachyodont and lophobunodont teeth, teeth that have a combination of ridges (lophodont dentition) and cones (bunodont dentition). It had a generalized way of locomotion, that means, it could move easily in any terrain, but probably it preferred the safety of the forest trees where it lived. Although being an ungulate, Allalmeia had claws as the oldest mammals.

References 

Typotheres
Eocene mammals of South America
Tinguirirican
Divisaderan
Paleogene Argentina
Fossils of Argentina
Fossil taxa described in 1946
Prehistoric placental genera